A small stream called the Wairoa Stream is found on Motiti Island in the Bay of Plenty, New Zealand.

Rivers of the Bay of Plenty Region
Rivers of New Zealand